is a passenger railway station in the city of Kashiwa, Chiba Prefecture, Japan. Its station number is TX13.

Line
Kashiwanoha-campus Station is served by the Metropolitan Intercity Railway Company's Tsukuba Express line, which operates between Akihabara Station in Tokyo and Tsukuba Station.

Station layout
The station consists of two opposed elevated side platforms, with the station building located underneath. The station building was designed by architect Makoto Sei Watanabe.

Platforms

History
The station opened on 24 August 2005, coinciding with the opening of the Tsukuba Express line.

Passenger statistics
In fiscal 2019, the station was used by an average of 18,015 passengers daily (boarding passengers only).

Surrounding area
The station is surrounded by large-scale new town housing developments.

See also
 List of railway stations in Japan

References

External links

 TX Kashiwanoha-campus Station 

Railway stations in Japan opened in 2005
Railway stations in Chiba Prefecture
Stations of Tsukuba Express
Kashiwa